The 2020 Motul FIM Superbike World Championship was the 33rd season of the Superbike World Championship.

Race calendar and results
The 2020 season calendar was announced on 21 November 2019, with 13 rounds scheduled. The championship visited Circuit de Barcelona-Catalunya (on 19 and 20 September) for the first time, and a round was due to be staged at Oschersleben – on 1 and 2 August – for the first time since . Due to the coronavirus pandemic, the Losail round was postponed to an unannounced date and the Jerez, Assen, Aragon and Misano rounds were rescheduled to a later date, while the Imola and Oschersleben rounds were cancelled. As a result of updates made to the MotoGP calendar for the same reason, the French round date was also affected. Despite having already been rescheduled, the Assen round was later postponed to a to-be-determined date, along with the Donington round.

On 19 June, an updated calendar was published; for the restart, Jerez and Portimão were brought forward from their respective dates and a second round at Aragon was added to the schedule. Other five rounds—the first at Aragon, as well as Barcelona, Magny-Cours, San Juan and Misano—either kept their original or revised dates, although the latter two events were labelled as 'to be confirmed'. Three rounds—Losail, Donington and Assen—were included without a confirmed date and were subsequently cancelled on 24 July. The San Juan round was cancelled on the 13 August whilst the Misano round was cancelled and replaced by a round in Estoril on 18 August. It was the first time since 1993 that the championship raced at Estoril.

Entry list

All entries used Pirelli tyres.

Championship standings
Points were awarded as follows:
Race 1 and Race 2

Superpole Race

Riders' championship

Manufacturers' championship

Notes

References

External links 

Superbike
Superbike
Superbike World Championship seasons